Ancient history in Asia is usually taken to include
Southwest Asia
The Ancient Near East
History of Iran, from Elam to the Persian Empire

South Asia
Ancient India, from the Indus Valley civilization to Iron Age India
Middle kingdoms of India, from the Maurya Empire to the Gupta Empire
 Southern kingdom of India, the Chola dynasty.

East Asia
Iron Age China, from the Spring and Autumn period and the early imperial period under the Han dynasty
History of China, from the Han dynasty to the Tang dynasty
The Proto–Three Kingdoms of Korea and Three Kingdoms of Korea 
The History of Japan from the Kofun period to the Heian period
The Thục dynasty to the Second Chinese domination in Vietnam

Southeast Asia
History of Southeast Asia, from prehistory to Contemporary Southeast Asia.

History of Asia
Prehistoric Asia